The Tacub massacre was the mass murder of a group of Muslim Moros by Philippine government troops at a military checkpoint on October 24, 1971. The Moros were returning from attempting to vote in a special election; they had been turned away by the Ilaga from polling places in Magsaysay, Lanao del Norte. The troops were later identified as troops of the Philippine Army stationed in Tacub, Kauswagan, Lanao del Norte, which then lent its name to the incident, and Christian civilians. At least 40 Moros were killed. Other sources report the number of fatalities to be as high as 66.

References

Massacres in the Philippines
History of Lanao del Norte
1971 crimes in the Philippines
Presidency of Ferdinand Marcos
1971 murders in the Philippines
Massacres under the Marcos dictatorship